Kwon Hyuk-woo (Hangul: 권혁우; born December 25, 1989), better known by his stage name Loco (Hangul: 로꼬), is a South Korean rapper signed to hip hop label AOMG. His name "loco" means "crazy" in Spanish. He won the first season of Mnet's rap competition Show Me the Money in 2012.

Personal life 
On September 13, 2022, Loco announced via Instagram that he would be marrying a non-celebrity girlfriend of the same age in the fall.

Discography

Studio albums

Extended plays

Singles

Soundtrack appearances

Filmography

Television

Web shows

Music video appearances

Awards and nominations

Melon Music Awards

KBS Entertainment Awards

References

External links

1989 births
Living people
South Korean male rappers
Show Me the Money (South Korean TV series) contestants
Singing talent show winners
People from Seoul
Melon Music Award winners